Kudlu Falls (also spelled kudlu teertha ) is in Udupi district, in the Western Ghats in Karnataka. It is located 42 km away from Udupi, 208 km from the Madikeri, 268 km from Bangalore and 122 km from Mysore.

References

Geography of Udupi district
Waterfalls of Karnataka